Aktiv Grizzly is dual-track snowmobile manufactured by Aktiv Maskin Östersund AB in Sweden.
The snowmobile is equipped with dual 38 x 384 cm tracks and single front ski. Also dual front skis has been available for XP. Tracks cover area almost 1 m2, making it well suited for deep-snow operations.
The Grizzly is powered by a 497 ccm Rotax 503 Scandinavia, producing 38 HP (28 kW) at 5700 RPM. The carb is a VM 32, supplied by Mikuni. Earlier Grizzly (de luxe) have 1+N+1 gearbox and last model (XP) (1989–1991) have 1+N+2 gearbox.
The Grizzly was produced from 1979 to 1991. It is still recognized one of the best dual track snowmobile in the world. Both Bombardiers Ski-Doo Alpine, Ski-Doo Alpine 2 and Ockelbo 8000 are similar dual-track snowmobiles.  
In the mid 80's, the Grizzly switched from the traditional wheelbased bogie to a flexible joint-bogie, which made the ride smoother and the passability much better.

Aktiv started making tracked vehicles 1957 when they started making Snow Trac, a small personal Snowcat that is roughly the size of a modern compact car. Aktiv started making small snowmobiles in 1973 when they bought Snö-Tric brand. First dual-Trac snowmobile made by Aktiv was Snö-Tric Blå 75- and  SC 20/2 75-.

The Grizzly was also produced and sold on license by Polaris Industries under the name "Polaris Grizzly de luxe". This version had a Fuji 440 ccm engine. Also Finnish company Winha sold earlier grizzly (1982–1983) with own brand name Winha. Winha Grizzly had either traditional wheelbased bogie or flexible joint-bogie and it was equipped either with Artic Spirit AB 50, A3 engine or Fuji EC 44-2PM-3000 engine.

Currently there are two dual-track snowmobile in production, one in Russia under the name "Buran" and one in Italy under the name "Alpina Sherpa".

Technical data

Links and resources 

Skoterportalen Grizzly Page (Swedish)
Red Cross in Norway are still using Grizzly
David's Vintage Snowmobile Page on Aktiv Grizzly

Snowmobile brands